The 35th CARIFTA Games was held in the René Serge Nabajoth Stadium in Les Abymes, Guadeloupe on April 15–17, 2006.    A detailed appraisal of the results has been given.

Participation (unofficial)

Detailed result lists can be found on the CACAC, the CFPI and the "World
Junior Athletics History" website. An unofficial count yields
the number of about 524 athletes (268 junior (under-20) and 256 youth
(under-17)) from about 25 countries: Anguilla (4), Antigua and Barbuda (11),
Aruba (4), Bahamas (62), Barbados (40), Bermuda (17), British Virgin Islands
(8), Cayman Islands (12), Dominica (5), French Guiana (15), Grenada (11),
Guadeloupe (72), Guyana (2), Haiti (7), Jamaica (70), Martinique (45),
Montserrat (3), Netherlands Antilles (12), Saint Kitts and Nevis (21), Saint
Lucia (5), Saint Vincent and the Grenadines (5), Suriname (3), Trinidad and
Tobago (57), Turks and Caicos Islands (26), US Virgin Islands (7).

Records

A total of 8 new games records were set.  

In the boys' U-20 category, Ryan Brathwaite from Barbados achieved 13.85s (-1.4 m/s) in 110 metres hurdles.  The Jamaican 4x400 metres relay team set the new games record to 3:07.75.

In the girls' U-20 category, the 400 metres record was improved twice.  First,
to 51.82s in the heat by Kaliese Spencer, and then in the final, to 51.30s
by Sonita Sutherland, both from Jamaica.  Together with their teammates
Sherene Pinnock and Bobby-Gaye Wilkins, they finished the 4 x 400 metres
relay in the new record time of 3:31.90.

In the boys' U-17 category, Gavyn Nero of Trinidad and Tobago set two new
records in 1500 metres (4:00.78) and 3000 metres (8:53.42).

In the girls' U-17 category, Jamaican Natoya Goule set also two new records
in 800 metres (2:09.59) and 1500 metres (4:32.70).

Moreover, a total of 3 national (senior) records were set by the junior
athletes.  In the men's category, Shanovan Williams threw
the javelin to the new record mark for
the Turks and Caicos Islands
of 49.33 metres.

In the women's category, two records for 
the British Virgin Islands
were set by Chantel Malone in 55.70s for 400 metres, and together with the
4x400 metres relay team in 3:51.71.

Austin Sealy Award

The Austin Sealy Trophy for the
most outstanding athlete of the games was awarded to Gavyn Nero of
Trinidad and Tobago.  He won 3 gold medals (800m, 1500m and
3000m) in the youth (U-17) category, setting new 1500m and 3000m games record.

Medal summary
Medal winners are published by category: Boys under 20 (Junior), Girls under 20 (Junior), Boys under 17 (Youth), and Girls under 17 (Youth).
Complete results can be found on the CACAC, the CFPI and the "World Junior Athletics History"
website.

Boys under 20 (Junior)

o: Open event for both junior and youth athletes.

Girls under 20 (Junior)

o: Open event for both junior and youth athletes.

Boys under 17 (Youth)

Girls under 17 (Youth)

Medal table (unofficial)

The medal count has been published.  There is a mismatch between the unofficial medal count and the
published medal count for the Bahamas.  This can be explained by
the fact that there was a jump off between Jamal Wilson and Kyle Grant, both
from the Bahamas, in the Men's High Jump Under 20 competition, which is
separately listed in the results 
and might have been counted twice.

References

External links
World Junior Athletics History

CARIFTA Games
International sports competitions hosted by Guadeloupe
2006 in Guadeloupe
CARIFTA
2006 in Caribbean sport
Athletics competitions in Guadeloupe